The 1963–64 Egyptian Premier League, was the 14th season of the Egyptian Premier League, the top Egyptian professional league for association football clubs, since its establishment in 1948.The league consisted of 2 groups each of 12 clubs. The season started on 4 October 1963 and concluded on 16 June 1964.
Zamalek managed to win the league for the second time in the club's history.

League table

Group 1

 (Q)= Qualification to Championship play-off, (R)= Relegated, (QR)=Qualified to Relegation play-off, Pld = Matches played; W = Matches won; D = Matches drawn; L = Matches lost; F = Goals for; A = Goals against; ± = Goal difference; Pts = Points.

Group 2

 (Q)= Qualification to Championship play-off, (R)= Relegated, (QR)=Qualified to Relegation play-off, Pld = Matches played; W = Matches won; D = Matches drawn; L = Matches lost; F = Goals for; A = Goals against; ± = Goal difference; Pts = Points.

Relegation play-off

 (R)= Relegated, Pld = Matches played; W = Matches won; D = Matches drawn; L = Matches lost; F = Goals for; A = Goals against; ± = Goal difference; Pts = Points.

Final stage

Championship play-off matches

Zamalek won 7–3 on aggregate.

Top goalscorers

References

External links 
 All Egyptian Competitions Info

5
1963–64 in African association football leagues
1963–64 in Egyptian football